Sir William Mordaunt Milner, 3rd Baronet (6 October 1754 – 9 September 1811) of Nun Appleton Hall, Yorkshire, was a British Member of Parliament and Lord Mayor of York.

He was the eldest surviving son of Sir William Milner, 2nd Baronet, of Nun Appleton by Elizabeth, the daughter and coheiress of Revd. George Mordaunt. He was educated at Eton College between 1766 and 1769. He succeeded his father to the baronetcy in 1774.

He served in the British Army as a cornet in the 10th Dragoons from 1772 to 1776. Later in his life he would serve as an officer in the volunteer militia.

He was elected Lord Mayor of York for 1787–88 and again for a second term for 1798–99. He represented the city of York from 1790 to 1811 as a Whig in both the Parliament of Great Britain, and from the Acts of Union 1800 the Parliament of the United Kingdom.

He married in 1776, Diana, the daughter of Humphrey Sturt of Crichel More, Dorset. They had 3 sons and 2 daughters. He was succeeded by his son Sir William Mordaunt Sturt Milner, 4th Baronet.

References

|-

1754 births
1811 deaths
People educated at Eton College
Lord Mayors of York
Baronets in the Baronetage of Great Britain
Members of the Parliament of Great Britain for English constituencies
British MPs 1790–1796
British MPs 1796–1800
Members of the Parliament of the United Kingdom for English constituencies
UK MPs 1801–1802
UK MPs 1802–1806
UK MPs 1806–1807
UK MPs 1807–1812
UK MPs 1812–1818